Lumkani is a social enterprise launched by South African Students to deliver a networked heat detector device to decrease risks of fire in rural and urban informal settlements.

Foundation

Background 
Lumkani was initially a university project created by Francois Petousis, an electrical engineering student in the University of Cape Town. Petousis designed a smoke detector. The current Lumkani system utilizes rate of temperature change, the original temperature detection system being designed by Samuel Ginsberg.

In 2014, Petousis and his team created the Lumkani startup along with his supervisor Samuel Ginsberg, to sell the heat detector device. The name of the startup and the device has its origins in the local Xhosa language, Lumkani means “Be careful”.

The device 
The device is a small blue box that measure the rate of temperature rise rather than detecting smoke which helps in reducing false alarms. The network of Lumkani devices in a specific slum uses radio frequency to send text messages and notify people in cases of emergencies. An alarm will be activated in all houses within a  radius if the initial alarm is not disarmed within 30 seconds.

The central device of the network locates the GPS coordinates of the blaze, to coordinate with the fire department for immediate intervention.

Installation 
As of November 2014, Lumkani distributed 7,000 devices in South African slums. In 2015, more detectors were installed in 5000 households in South Africa's highest fire risk community in Cape Town, South Africa.
The start-up is planning to implement a social impact bond with several local governments to provide the device to numerous households in informal settlements for a small fee or for free.

Recognition & funding 
In 2014, the startup received funding from South Africa’s Technology Innovation Agency (TIA).

In the same year, the startup won Global Innovation through Science and Technology competition’s Best Start-up award.

In 2015, the startup’s device was a finalist in the Katherine M. Swanson Young Innovator Award. On the same year, Lumkani won the People’s Choice Award at Global Social Venture Competition.

In 2020, Lumkani won the EIC Horizon Prize for Affordable High-Tech on Humanitarian Aid, at EU Research&Innovation Days.

Expansion 
The startup is expanding its activities to other African countries and India.

References

External links

South African inventions
Fire detection and alarm companies
Technology companies established in 2014